Cisneros Media (abbreviated as CM, also known as Venevision International) is an entertainment company that broadcasts Spanish content in the United States and in other locations around the globe.

CMD is a Spanish-language Entertainment company with more than 30 years of experience in TV programming production and distribution, besides participating in other segments of the market. Venevision International is part of the Cisneros Group of Companies and was founded initially as the distribution company of this media holding.

CMD is headed today by Peter Tinoco. The company opened doors in 1969 under the name Teverama Florida along with Radio Caracas Television as distributors of Venezuelan programming abroad. After a split from RCTV (which formed Coral Pictures) was renamed America Television Inc. and finally in 1987 the company took the name of Venevision International.

As a distributor of television programming, VVI is one of the two largest companies in Spanish language. The programming catalogue is diverse in genres, and the company is renowned for its history and management expertise of the telenovela, an original type of program from Latin America that has achieved great success in international markets.

With a presence in five continents and more than 70 countries, Venevision International’s programs have harvested successes in Latin America, Europe and the rest of the world. Venevision International’s telenovelas have been broadcast in more than 100 countries and translated into 24 languages. In this genre the company launched in 2001 the first erotic soap opera “Latin Lover,” and in 2007 produced the first soap opera exclusively for cellular phones "Querido Profe" (Dear Teacher.) VVI presently supports exchange agreements and sales of TV programming in China and Korea, where the telenovelas have reached great popularity.

From the year 2000 the company embarked in a strategy of diversification to strengthen its catalogue with its own productions, and to participate in the profitable Hispanic market in the United States.   As a company that belongs to a mass media group, it decided to focus on the entertainment market, leveraging its relations with industry players, and its own capacity to commercially support its contents.

CMD has today operating divisions in the business of music production and distribution, film distribution, TV productions and distribution, pay television, original productions and content distribution for cellular phones and Internet and product integration through Synapsys International.

In television production, the company was pioneer in independent television production in Spanish in the city of Miami and one of the main companies of this segment in the industry. Also, since 2001 VVI has co-produced with Latin American and US companies, and also with the Chinese TV company CCTV in the Spanish version of a documentary of the Yangtze River.

CMD founded the first exclusive film distribution company in Spanish language in the United States launching movies in cinemas and distributing in pay-per-view, pay television, home video, the hospitality industry (hotels and tourism) and Internet. It is part of the companies that have renewed interest in the Latin American cinema in the US market.

As part of the Cisneros Group of Companies, the company has been always interested in launching TV channels (Global Television: How to Create Effective Television for the 1990s . Tony Verna. 1993. Page. 236.). Based on its film catalogue in Spanish, the company launched in 2006 its pay TV movie channel  VeneMovies, a signal that programs films 24 hours a day with interviews and coverage of the main festivals of the Hispanic market of the United States.

VeneMusic, Venevision International’s musical stamp, has turned into an important reference in the Latin music, with distribution agreements with the biggest labels of the music industry. Its market activities in the music industry expanded with a publishing unit that administers the rights of the artists and the musical pieces that support the television productions of the company.

In the area of cellular entertainment the company runs Latcel, a mobile content production and distribution company in the U.S. Hispanic market and VeneMobile, a division that offers contents of the Cisneros Group of Companies in the mobile markets worldwide

CMD also has participated in the business of television formats with an alliance with the Spanish company Nostromo and in the production of theater plays in the city of Miami, where it even had its own theatre from 2001 until 2005.

Novelas

Series

 Corazones extremos 2010
 No Puede Ser (telenovela) 2010
 Hawaii Five-0 2012

Programas

 La Guerra De Los Sexos
 Súper Sábado Sensacional
 ¡Qué Locura!

Talkshows

 Casos De Familia
 ¿Quién Tiene La Razón?
 Mujeres Con Historias Y Hombres Hambién

References

External links
 

Venevisión
Mass media companies of Venezuela
Entertainment companies of Venezuela
Mass media companies established in 1971